Tebelelo Mazile Seretse was the first woman to serve as ambassador to the United States from Botswana (effective February 14, 2011). While a member of Parliament from 1999 - 2004, she had three Cabinet level positions: Acting Minister of Presidential Affairs, Minister of Trade and Industry, Wildlife and Tourism and Minister of Works, Transport and Communications.

She was also Director and Chairperson of RPC Data Limited, "the largest integrated information technology services company in Botswana."

Seretse graduated from Morgan State University with a BA in Economics and a BA in Accounting before earning a MA from the University of Cincinnati and an LL.B. law degree from the University of Botswana.

In September 2021, the Minister of Tertiary Education, Research, Science and Technology (MoTE), Dr. Douglas Letsholathebe, announced the appointment of Ambassador Tebelelo Mazile Seretse as the Chancellor of the University of Botswana.The appointment was made by President Mokgweetsi Masisi and is effective from 1 September 2021 until 31 August 2026.

External links
TEBELELO SERETSE APPOINTED TO LEAD BOTSWANA DEMOCRATIC PARTY CAMPAIGNS AHEAD OF THE ONCOMING ELECTIONS AS CAMPAIGN MANAGER

References

Women ambassadors
Ambassadors of Botswana to the United States
Living people
Year of birth missing (living people)
Place of birth missing (living people)
Morgan State University alumni
University of Cincinnati alumni
University of Botswana alumni